Bobby DeAngelo Askew, Jr. (born August 19, 1980) is a former American football fullback. He played college football as the University of Michigan.  He ranks first all-time among Michigan running backs in reception yards.

Askew was selected in the third round of the 2003 NFL Draft by the New York Jets, the first out of eight fullbacks taken in the draft.  He has also played for the Tampa Bay Buccaneers.

High school years
Askew attended Colerain High School in Cincinnati, Ohio, and was a letterwinner in football, basketball, and track & field. In basketball, he averaged 10 points per game as a junior. Askew graduated from Colerain High School in 1999.

Professional football career
Askew was a third round draft pick by the New York Jets in 2003.

He was later signed by the Buccaneers to back up Mike Alstott, but assumed starting duties when Alstott went down with a neck injury. On May 15, 2008, the team gave him a four-year contract extension. It was a 5-year deal worth $8.6 million, making him one of the league's highest-paid fullbacks.

On April 26, 2010, the Buccaneers released Askew.

Notes

External links
Tampa Bay Buccaneers bio

1980 births
American football fullbacks
Living people
Michigan Wolverines football players
New York Jets players
Players of American football from Cincinnati
Tampa Bay Buccaneers players